Basil Lavon Stanley (February 8, 1896 – July 17, 1975) was an American football player and coach of football and basketball.  Stanley played professionally as a guard for one season, in 1924, with the Rock Island Independents of the National Football League (NFL).  Stanley served as the head basketball coach at the University of Arizona from 1922 to 1924.

References

External links
 
 College-Basketball-Reference profile
 

1896 births
1975 deaths
American football guards
Arizona Wildcats men's basketball coaches
Basketball coaches from Indiana
Notre Dame Fighting Irish football coaches
Notre Dame Fighting Irish football players
Rock Island Independents players
Wisconsin–River Falls Falcons football coaches
People from Montpelier, Ohio
Players of American football from South Bend, Indiana